This list ranks the countries of the world by the number of mobile phone numbers in use. Note that it is not the number of phone devices that are being given here, but the number of phone numbers in a country.
In some countries, one person might have two mobile phones. Also, some mobile phone numbers may be used by machines as a modem (examples: intrusion detection systems, home automation, leak detection).



See also 
 List of countries by smartphone penetration
 List of countries by number of telephone lines in use
 List of mobile network operators
 List of countries by number of Internet users

Notes

References

External links 
 World Map and Chart of Number of Mobile cellular subscriptions per country by Lebanese-economy-forum, World Bank data
 https://www.djrohitgourr.co/2020/07/best-smartphone-under-20000-Rs.html 

International telecommunications
Mobile phone numbers in use
 Number
Countries by number of mobile phone numbers